Ricki Ariansyah (born 10 June 1997) is an Indonesian professional footballer who plays as a midfielder for Liga 1 club Madura United.

Club career

PSCS Cilacap
Ariansyah signed with PSCS Cilacap to play in the Indonesian Liga 2 for the 2020 season. This season was suspended on 27 March 2020 due to the COVID-19 pandemic. The season was abandoned and was declared void on 20 January 2021.

Persijap Jepara
In 2021, Ariansyah signed a contract with Indonesian Liga 2 club Persijap Jepara. He made his league debut on 27 September 2021 in a match against Hizbul Wathan at the Manahan Stadium, Surakarta.

Persita Tangerang
He was signed for Persita Tangerang to play in Liga 1 in the 2021 season. Ariansyah made his league debut on 7 January 2022 in a match against Persib Bandung at the Ngurah Rai Stadium, Denpasar.

Madura United
Ariansyah was signed for Madura United to play in Liga 1 in the 2022–23 season. He made his league debut on 23 July 2022 in a match against Barito Putera at the Gelora Ratu Pamelingan Stadium, Pamekasan.

Career statistics

Club

References

External links
 Ricki Ariansyah at Soccerway
 Ricki Ariansyah at Liga Indonesia

1997 births
Living people
People from Medan
Sportspeople from North Sumatra
Indonesian footballers
Liga 2 (Indonesia) players
Liga 1 (Indonesia) players
Pro Duta FC players
PSCS Cilacap players
Perserang Serang players
Persijap Jepara players
Persita Tangerang players
Madura United F.C. players
Association football midfielders
21st-century Indonesian people